The 307th Fighter Squadron is a McDonnell Douglas F-15E Strike Eagle unit and is part of Air Force Reserve Command's 414th Fighter Group stationed at Seymour Johnson Air Force Base, North Carolina.

The mission of the 307 FS is to assist the 4th Fighter Wing at Seymour Johnson to produce qualified F-15E aircrew. The squadron became operational in September 2011.

History

World War II
Initially established under Third Air Force in early 1942 as a fighter squadron at Baer Field, Indiana, flying some antisubmarine patrols in the Gulf of Mexico.

Deployed to the European Theater of Operations in June 1942 without aircraft as its Curtiss P-40 Warhawks and Bell P-39 Airacobras were deemed unsuitable for use against German aircraft in long-range bomber escort duties. Was re-equipped with RAF Supermarine Spitfire Vs and its pilots and technicians spent a two-month period undergoing intensive training in flying and fighting with RAF pilots in the British aircraft from airfields in southeast England. The squadron flew its first combat mission on 18 August 1942, when it attacked enemy positions in occupied France.

Assigned to the new Twelfth Air Force and deployed to Gibraltar in November 1942 as part of the Operation Torch invasion forces, initially operating from former Vichy French airfields in Algeria. Advanced east across Algeria and Tunisia during the North African Campaign, supporting the Fifth United States Army which halted Field Marshal Rommel's advance on allied positions.

Spitfires from the squadron provided support for Allied Forces as the Invasion of Italy began with the capture of Sicily, and later the landings by Allied forces in Fascist Italy, moving north supporting the Fifth Army during the Italian Campaign. As Allied bomber forces operating from Italy began the strategic bombing of Axis petroleum and communications facilities in central Europe and the Balkans, the squadron was re-equipped with the North American P-51 Mustang to replace the shorter-ranged Spitfire. In August 1944, the P-51's were involved in the invasion of Southern France. 

By war's end, the squadron had earned two Distinguished Unit Citations and was involved in eight campaigns The squadron was largely demobilized during the summer of 1945 in Europe, a skeleton force returned to Drew Field, Florida in August, inactivating largely as an administrative unit in November.

Reactivated from elements of several inactivating organizations in Germany in August 1946, Performed occupation duty and operating early-model Lockheed P-80A Shooting Star jets from former Luftwaffe jet-capable airfields at AAF Station Giebelstadt and AAF Station Kitzingen. Returned to the United States in June 1947 without personnel or equipment which remained in Germany.

Cold War
Assigned to Strategic Air Command at Langley Field, Virginia as a fighter-escort squadron, equipped with straight-winged Republic F-84E Thunderjets. Assigned to Turner AFB, Georgia with mission of long-range escort of B-29 Superfortress bombers, later B-50 and B-36 Peacemakers as newer aircraft came into operation by SAC. Inactivated 1958 with phaseout of B-36 and end of SAC escort fighter concept.

Reactivated in 1959 as Tactical Air Command North American F-100 Super Sabre fighter-bomber squadron at George Air Force Base, California. Trained in tactical air support of ground forces, deploying to NATO bases for operational exercises. Reassigned to Homestead Air Force Base, Florida after the Cuban Missile Crisis, late 1962 to provide air defense of South Florida. Was deployed for 3 months to Southeast Asia, in 1964 as part of advisory forces operating against North Vietnamese and National Liberation Front forces in South Vietnam.

Reassigned to NATO, becoming permanently based at Torrejon AB, Spain in 1966 when SAC turned Spanish bases over to USAFE. Initially equipped with F-100s, in 1970 received McDonnell F-4E Phantom IIs. Reassigned back to TAC at Homestead AFB in 1971, as part of re-establishment of 31st TFW upon its return from duty in Southeast Asia. Was deployed to Thailand, July 1972, engaging North Vietnamese forces in northern South Vietnam in response to the communist spring offensive. Returned to the United States in the late fall, 1972.

For the next 20 years, performed routine training and tactical deployments from Homestead, upgraded to the General Dynamics F-16A Fighting Falcon in 1988. At the end of 1986 the squadron and wing changed tail codes from ZF to HS which better matched the squadrons location in Homestead. Upgraded to receive Shaw AFB block 25s in August 1990. With the Gulf War build up and the 363rd TFW at Shaw AFB deploying to Saudi Arabia meant no more block 25s were available. With some F-16A/B block 15s still in service for the 307th TFS, it continued to operate both types.

When Desert Storm ended it was decided to convert the 31st TFW to block 40 F-16s instead. Up to this point about ten block 25s had reached the 307th FS and had been painted in 'Emerald Knight' markings. They were all sent to other units. Neither of the 31st TFWs other sister squadrons flew the block 25. In March 1991 the 307th began conversion to the block 40 version of the F-16. On 1 October 1991 the word 'Tactical' was dropped and unit became the 307th Fighter Squadron. By early 1992 the conversion to block 40 F-16s with the general purpose role was complete.

Moved to Moody Air Force Base, Georgia in late August 1992 when Hurricane Andrew threatened South Florida. It was to be a temporary move to Moody, but Homestead AFB was so heavily damaged it was never re-opened for any of the 31st FW squadrons and was eventually turned over to the Air Force Reserve Command's 482nd Fighter Wing and renamed Homestead Air Reserve Base. After the destruction of Homestead AFB, the 307th FS was reassigned permanently to the 347th Operations Group at Moody. At this point the 'HS' tail code began to be replaced with a 'MY' tail code, with some block 40 F-16s were delivered right from the factory to the 307th Fighter Squadron's new home base. It deployed to Saudi Arabia from, March–June 1995 in support of Operation Southern Watch. Inactivated in 1995 when Air Combat Command temporarily closed down ACC operations at the base, temporarily turning Moody over to Air Education and Training Command as a training base.

Modern era
It was reactivated in 2003 as an Air Force Reserve Command McDonnell Douglas F-15 Eagle training squadron, where its mission was to train Air Force Reserve pilots in the F-15C at Langley Air Force Base, Virginia as an adjunct for the 1st Fighter Wing. The unit was moved from Langley to Seymour Johnson Air Force Base in 2010 in realignment with the phaseout of the F-15C at Langley pending the arrival of the F-22 Raptor and the need for an Associate Air Force Reserve F-15E Strike Eagle unit at Seymour Johnson.

Lineage
 Constituted 'as the 307th Pursuit Squadron (Interceptor) on 21 January 1942
 Activated on 30 January 1942
 Redesignated 307th Fighter Squadron on 15 May 1942
 Redesignated 307th Fighter Squadron, Single Engine on 20 August 1943
 Inactivated on 7 November 1945
 Activated on 20 August 1946
 Redesignated 307th Fighter Squadron, Jet Propelled on 19 February 1947
 Redesignated 307th Fighter Squadron, Single Engine on 3 November 1947
 Redesignated 307th Fighter Squadron, Jet on 15 June 1948
 Redesignated 307th Fighter-Bomber Squadron on 20 January 1950
 Redesignated 307th Fighter-Escort Squadron on 16 July 1950
 Redesignated 307th Strategic Fighter Squadron on 20 January 1953
 Redesignated 307th Fighter-Bomber Squadron on 1 April 1957
 Redesignated 307th Tactical Fighter Squadron on 1 July 1958
 Redesignated 307th Tactical Fighter Training Squadron on 1 July 1983
 Redesignated 307th Tactical Fighter Squadron on 1 April 1988
 Inactivated on 1 July 1989
 Activated on 30 September 1991
 Re-designated 307th Fighter Squadron' on 1 November 1991
 Inactivated on 31 August 1995
 Activated in the reserve on 1 August 2003

Assignments
 31st Pursuit Group (later 31st Fighter Group), 30 January 1942 – 7 November 1945
 31st Fighter Group (later 31st Fighter-Bomber Group, 31st Fighter Escort Group), 20 August 1946 (attached to 31st Fighter-Escort Wing after 27 July 1951)
 31st Fighter-Escort Wing (later 31st Strategic Fighter Wing, 31st Fighter-Bomber Wing, 31st Tactical Fighter Wing), 16 June 1952
 Attached to Alaskan Air Command, 7 November–7 December 1956
 Attached to 48th Fighter-Bomber Wing, 27 February–9 August 1958
 Attached to Unknown, 15 March–19 July 1959, 8 November 1960 – 9 March 1961, and 18–28 February 1962
 Attached to 18th Tactical Fighter Wing, 17 December 1962 – 16 March 1963
 Attached to Unknown, 27 December 1963 – 5 March 1964
 Attached to 7231st Combat Support Group, 23 November 1964 – 14 March 1965
 Attached to 34th Tactical Group, 24 June–7 July 1965
 Attached to 6251st Tactical Fighter Wing, 8 July – 20 November 1965
 Attached to 3d Tactical Fighter Wing, 21 November – 6 December 1965
 401st Tactical Fighter Wing, 27 April 1966
 31st Tactical Fighter Wing (later 31st Tactical Training Wing, 31st Tactical Fighter Wing), 15 July 1971 – 1 July 1989
 Attached to 432d Tactical Reconnaissance Wing, 29 July–31 October 1972
 31st Tactical Fighter Wing (later 31st Fighter Wing), 30 September 1991
 31st Operations Group, 1 November 1991 (attached to 347th Operations Group after c. 11 September 1992
 347th Operations Group, 20 November 1992 – 31 August 1995
 Tenth Air Force, 1 August 2003
 414th Fighter Group, 23 March 2010 – present

Stations

 Baer Field, Indiana, 30 January 1942
 New Orleans Army Air Base, Louisiana, c. 5 February 1942 – 19 May 1942
 RAF Atcham (AAF-342), England, 11 June 1942
 RAF Biggin Hill (AAF-343), England, 1 August 1942
 RAF Merston, England (AAF-351), 24 August–22 October 1942
 Tafaraoui Airfield, Algeria, 9 November 1942
 La Senia Airfield, Oran, Algeria, 12 November 1942
 Maison Blanche Airport, Algeria, 21 December 1942
 Thelepte Airfield, Tunisia, 7 February 1943
 Tebessa Airfield, Algeria, 17 February 1943
 Youks-les-Bains Airfield, Algeria, 22 February 1943
 Kalaa Djerda Airfield, Tunisia, 25 February 1943
 Thelepte Airfield, Tunisia, 11 March 1943
 Djilma Airfield, Tunisia, 7 April 1943
 Le Sers Airfield, Tunisia, 12 April 1943
 Korba Airfield, Tunisia, c. 15 May 1943
 Gozo, Malta, c. 30 June 1943
 Ponte Olivo Airfield, Sicily, Italy, c. 14 July 1943
 Agrigento Airfield, Sicily, Italy, 21 July 1943
 Palermo Airfield, Sicily, 27 July 1943
 Termini Imerese, Sicily, Italy, 1 August 1943
 Milazzo Airfield, Sicily, Italy, 3 September 1943
 Montecorvino Airfield, Italy, 21 September 1943
 Pomigliano Airfield, Italy, 13 October 1943
 Castel Volturno Airfield, Italy, 18 January 1944
 San Severo Airfield, Italy, 2 April 1944
 Mondolfo Airfield, Italy, 3 March 1945
 Triolo Airfield, Italy, c. 15 July 1945 – 5 August 1945
 Drew Field, Florida, c. 25 August 1945 – 7 November 1945
 AAF Station Giebelstadt, Germany, 20 August 1946)
 AAF Station Kitzingen, Germany, 25 September 1946
 Langley Field, Virginia (1947)
 Turner Air Force Base, Georgia, 4 September 1947
 Deployed to RAF Manston, England 26 December 1950 – 25 July 1951
 Deployed to Misawa Air Base, Japan 20 July – 16 October 1952, 7 November 1953 – 9 February 1954
 Deployed to Eielson Air Force Base, Alaska 7 November – 7 December 1956
 Deployed to Hahn Air Base, Germany 25 February – 17 August 1958)\
 George Air Force Base, California, 15 March 1959
 Deployed to Moron Air Base, Spain 15 March – 19 July 1959
 Deployed to Aviano Air Base, Italy 8 November 1960 – 9 March 1961
 Deployed to Ramey Air Force Base, Puerto Rico 18–28 February 1962
 Homestead Air Force Base, Florida, 1 June 1962
 Deployed to Kadena Air Base, Okinawa (17 December 1962 – 16 March 1963)
 Deployed to Itazuke Air Base, Japan (27 December 1963 – 5 March 1964)
 Deployed to Çiğli Air Base, Turkey (23 November 1964 – 14 March 1965)
 Deployed to Bien Hoa Air Base, South Vietnam (24 June – 7 December 1965)
 Torrejon Air Base, Spain, 27 April 1966 – 14 July 1971
 Homestead Air Force Base, Florida, 15 July 1971 – 1 July 1989
 Deployed to Udorn Royal Thai Air Force Base, Thailand 29 July – 31 October 1972
 Homestead Air Force Base, Florida, 30 September 1991(operated from Moody Air Force Base, Georgia after c. 11 September 1992
 Moody Air Force Base, Georgia, 1 October 1992 – 31 August 1995
 Langley Air Force Base, Virginia, 1 August 2003
 Seymour Johnson Air Force Base, North Carolina, 15 July 2010 – present

Aircraft

 Curtiss P-40 Warhawk (1942)
 Bell P-39 Airacobra (1942)
 Supermarine Spitfire (1942–1943)
 North American P-51 Mustang (1943–1945, 1947–1948)
 Lockheed P-80 Shooting Star (1946–1947)
 Republic F-84 Thunderjet (1948–1957)
 North American F-100 Super Sabre (1957–1970)
 McDonnell F-4 Phantom II (1970–1988)
 General Dynamics F-16 Fighting Falcon (1988–1989, 1991–1995)
 McDonnell Douglas F-15C/D Eagle (2003–2010)
 McDonnell Douglas F-15E Strike Eagle (2010–present)

References

 Notes

 Citations

Bibliography

 
 
 
 

307
Military units and formations in North Carolina
Fighter squadrons of the United States Army Air Forces